The  is an aerial tramway in Mount Yoshino, Yoshino, Nara, Japan, operated by Yoshino Ōmine Kēburu Ropeway Bus Co., Ltd. This is the oldest surviving aerial lift line in the nation. The line opened on March 12, 1929, a year after Yoshino Railway, the current Kintetsu Yoshino Line, opened the railway line to Yoshino Station. The line uses two cabins, named Kaede (Maple) and Sakura (Cherry). The cabins have stair-like floors; the classical style that has become uncommon nowadays. Although the cabins and cables have been updated, the spans are still those constructed in 1928. The line is not only a sightseeing line to Mount Yoshino, but also a local transport for residents there. As such, there is a commuter pass available.

Basic data
System: Aerial tramway, 2 track cables and 2 haulage ropes
Distance: 
Vertical interval: 
Maximum gradient: 27°
Operational speed: 2 m/s
Passenger capacity: 28

Services
Cabins operate once every 30 minutes in most seasons. In the spring hanami (cherry blossom viewing) season, cabins operate once every 15 minutes during the day and every 20 minutes in the morning and evening. The whole ride takes 3 minutes. The fare costs ¥360 one-way, or ¥610 for a round-trip.

Stations
Yoshino Senbonguchi Station: Transfer to Yoshino, Kintetsu Yoshino Line.
Yoshinoyama Station

See also
List of aerial lifts in Japan

External links
 Yoshino Ōmine Kēburu Bus official website

Aerial tramways in Japan
1929 establishments in Japan